Lindersville is an extinct town in Adair County, in the U.S. state of Missouri.

A post office called Lindersville was established in 1865, and remained in operation until 1905.  The community is named after James H. Linder.

References

Ghost towns in Missouri
Former populated places in Adair County, Missouri